The Scheldecross Antwerpen is a cyclo-cross race held in Antwerp (Antwerpen), Belgium. Since 2015 it is part of the DVV Trophy.

Past winners

References
 Men's results
 Women's results

Cyclo-cross races
Cycle races in Belgium
Recurring sporting events established in 2006
2006 establishments in Belgium
Sport in Antwerp